NU 2 Stadium is a multi-use stadium in Motherwell, Eastern Cape, South Africa. It is currently used mostly for football matches and is the home ground of Bay Academy.

Between January and February, schools of Motherwell they go there to race. The school that has won the prizes it has to go with it."Riboh".

References

Sports venues in the Eastern Cape
Soccer venues in South Africa
Multi-purpose stadiums in South Africa
Sport in Port Elizabeth
Buildings and structures in Port Elizabeth